The San Diego Riptide was a professional arena football team based in San Diego, California. The team played its home games at the San Diego Sports Arena.

The team was originally coached by Cree Morris, then Mouse Davis and finally by Sean Ponder.

The Riptide never officially announced that it had ceased operations, but never came back from its hiatus after the 2005 season, and the AF2 folded into the AFL following the latter's 2009 bankruptcy.

Season-by-season 

|-
|2002 || 7 || 9 || 0 || 2nd NC Western || Won Round 1 (San Diego 40, Bakersfield 27) Lost NC Semifinals (Peoria 22, San Diego 12)
|-
|2003 || 6 || 10 || 0 || 4th NC Western || --
|-
|2004 || 8 || 8 || 0 || 3rd NC Western || --
|-
|2005 || 5 || 11 || 0 || 5th NC Western || --
|-
!Totals || 27 || 39 || 0
|colspan="2"| (including playoffs)
|}

See also
Arena Football League
AF2

External links
 San Diego Riptide on ArenaFan.com

Riptide
Defunct af2 teams
Defunct American football teams in California
American football teams established in 2002
American football teams disestablished in 2005
2002 establishments in California
2005 disestablishments in California